Dmitriy Igorievich Shevchenko (born May 13, 1968 in Taganrog) is a Russian discus thrower who won silver medals at the World and European Championships. Despite this he did not throw past the 70 metres mark until 2002, when he achieved his personal best throw of 70.54 metres in Krasnodar. His three participations in the Olympics were all fruitless, especially the 2004 edition where he exited without any valid throws.

He is a six-time national champion in the discus event. He missed the 1996 and 1997 seasons, due to a doping suspension.

His wife, whom he also coaches, is the hurdler Irina Shevchenko.

International competitions

See also
List of doping cases in athletics

References

External links 

Dmitriy Shevchenko

1968 births
Living people
Sportspeople from Taganrog
Soviet male discus throwers
Russian male discus throwers
Russian athletics coaches
Olympic male discus throwers
Olympic athletes of the Unified Team
Olympic athletes of Russia
Athletes (track and field) at the 1992 Summer Olympics
Athletes (track and field) at the 2000 Summer Olympics
Athletes (track and field) at the 2004 Summer Olympics
Goodwill Games medalists in athletics
Competitors at the 1994 Goodwill Games
Competitors at the 1998 Goodwill Games
World Athletics Championships athletes for the Soviet Union
World Athletics Championships athletes for Russia
World Athletics Championships medalists
European Athletics Championships medalists
Soviet Athletics Championships winners
Russian Athletics Championships winners
Doping cases in athletics
Russian sportspeople in doping cases
Goodwill Games gold medalists in athletics